The church of St. Luke the Evangelist is a church of Rome in Prenestino-Labicano district, in Largo San Luca Evangelista (via Roberto Malatesta).

History
It was built between 1955 and 1958 to a design by architects Lucio and Vincenzo Passarelli, and solemnly inaugurated by Monsignor Luigi Traglia on June 20, 1957

The church is home parish, erected January 2, 1956 with the decree of the Cardinal Vicar Clemente Micara Neminem sane latet. It is also home to the cardinal's title of "San Luca Via Prenestina", founded by Pope Paul VI April 29, 1969.

The church was visited by Pope John Paul II November 4, 1979.

List of Cardinal Protectors

 Antonio Poma 30 April 1969 – 24 September 1985
 José Freire Falcão 28 June 1988 – 26 September 2021

References

External links
 San Luca Evangelista 

Titular churches
Rome Q. VII Prenestino-Labicano
Roman Catholic churches completed in 1958
20th-century Roman Catholic church buildings in Italy